Homoeosoma striatellum is a species of snout moth in the genus Homoeosoma. It was described by Harrison Gray Dyar Jr. in 1905. It is found in North America, including Arizona, California and Nevada.

The wingspan is 18–22 mm. The forewings are pale gray and the veins are all lined with black. The ground color is dusted with blackish. The hindwings are whitish and ashen at the margin.

References

Further reading

External links

 mothphotographersgroup
 "Homoeosoma Curtis, 1833" at Markku Savela's Lepidoptera and Some Other Life Forms

Moths described in 1905
Phycitini